Jashvant Mehta is an Indian politician. He was elected to the Lok Sabha, the lower house of the Parliament of India from Bhavnagar in Gujarat as a member of the Praja Socialist Party.

References

External links
Official biographical sketch in Parliament of India website

India MPs 1962–1967
Lok Sabha members from Gujarat
Praja Socialist Party politicians